Fritzner is a surname. Notable people with the name include:

Herzl Fritzner (1919–2007), Israeli footballer and manager
Julius Fritzner (1828–1882), Norwegian restaurateur and hotelier
Ola Fritzner (1895–1983), Norwegian military officer
Otto Thott Fritzner Müller (1864–1944), Norwegian schoolteacher and politician